Cyril John Gadd,  (2 July 1893 – 2 December 1969) was a British Assyriologist, Sumerologist, and curator. He was Keeper of the  Department of Egyptian and Assyrian Antiquities, British Museum from 1948 to 1955, and Professor of Ancient Semitic Languages and Civilizations at the School of Oriental and African Studies, University of London from 1955 to 1960. Having served in the British Army during the First World War, he joined the British Museum after demobilisation and also worked on excavations at Ur, Carchemish, Alalakh and Nimrud. Having risen to Keeper, he left the British Museum to enter academia, and was appointed professor emeritus on his retirement in 1961.

Selected works

References

External links
 

 

 
 

1893 births
1969 deaths
British Assyriologists
Employees of the British Museum
Academics of SOAS University of London
British archaeologists
Commanders of the Order of the British Empire
Fellows of the British Academy
Fellows of the Society of Antiquaries of London
People from Bath, Somerset